Delhi Mercantile Society D.M.S in Gulshan Town, is a neighborhood in the Karachi East district of Karachi, Pakistan. It was previously administered as part of the Gulshan Town borough, which was disbanded in 2011.

This neighbourhood was established by the Jamiat-e-Punjabi-Saudagaran-e-Delhi, a community of Punjabi-Muslim traders, originally from Delhi, India, who migrated to Pakistan after independence in 1947.

The bulk of the population still comprises the Punjabi Saudagaran-e-Delhi, as the Mercantile Society's rules make it very difficult for other groups to purchase property in this locality.

See also
 Jamiat-e-Punjabi-Saudagaran-e-Delhi

References

External links
 Karachi Metropolitan Corporation official website

Neighbourhoods of Karachi
Gulshan Town